This is a list of members of the Sahrawi National Council after the 2020 Sahrawi legislative election.

Members

Military regions

Wilayas

Mass organisations

Consultative Council

Footnotes
Below is a list of the original names of the elected members in Arabic, as the transcriptions (done using Spanish ortography as usual in the Sahrawi Republic) are manually done and thus might be innacurate.

References

Sahrawi Arab Democratic Republic
Sahrawi Arab Democratic Republic